Orgesi Sulce (born 20 April 2000) is an Albanian professional footballer who plays as a centre-forward for Marko.

References 

Living people
2000 births
Albanian footballers
Association football forwards
Apollon Larissa F.C. players
Panathinaikos F.C. players